Papyrus 121 (in the Gregory-Aland numbering), designated by 𝔓121, is an early copy of the New Testament in Greek. It is a papyrus manuscript of the Gospel of John. The surviving texts of John are only fragments of verses 19:17-18,25-26. They are in very fragmentary condition. The manuscript paleographically has been assigned to the 3rd century by the INTF.

The manuscript currently is housed at the Papyrology Rooms of the Sackler Library at Oxford with the shelf number P. Oxy. 4805.

Description 
The manuscript is written irregular, spaces between letters are not equal. Though the text is very small, it contains two of the nomina sacra: ΙΣ and ΜΗΙ (dative case from ΜΗΡ). Above letter iota two dots (diaeresis). On page recto, in lower line, from the left a scribe did not use letter iota in word και (and), though inserted diaeresis above letter alpha. Possibly it is a scribal error.

Text 

The Greek text of the codex is too brief to determine its textual character. It can not be placed to any of Categories of New Testament manuscripts. It contains only 20 letters on recto, and 18 letters on verso.

In red colour missing letters.

See also 

 List of New Testament papyri 
 Oxyrhynchus Papyri

References

Further reading 

 R. Hatzilambrou, P. J. Parsons, J. Chapa The Oxyrhynchus Papyri, LXXI (London: 2007), pp. 9–11.

External links

Images 
 P.Oxy.LXIV 4805 from Papyrology at Oxford's "POxy: Oxyrhynchus Online"

Official registration 
 "Continuation of the Manuscript List" Institute for New Testament Textual Research, University of Münster. Retrieved April 9, 2008

New Testament papyri
3rd-century biblical manuscripts
Early Greek manuscripts of the New Testament
Gospel of John papyri